Corinne Alphen (born September 27, 1954) is an American model and actress. She was a two-time Penthouse Pet of the Month and a Pet of the Year. Alphen is also a professional Tarot card reader.

Biography
Corinne Alphen was born in Lynn, Massachusetts, as one of five children of William Alphen, who had served as a deputy chief of police, and his wife Marjorie. Her siblings are sister Robin and brothers Billy, Scott, and Glenn.

Alphen was chosen as Penthouse Pet of the Month for June 1978 and again for August 1981. She was named 1982 Pet of the Year.

She appeared in US movies and TV shows in the 1980s and early 1990s. Roger Ebert's review of the 1983 teen film Spring Break praised her appearance, and regretted that hers was not the film's main role.<ref name=Ebert>{{cite news|url=https://www.rogerebert.com/reviews/spring-break-1983|title=Spring Break|authorlink=Roger Ebert|first=Roger|last=Ebert|newspaper=Chicago Sun-Times|date=March 29, 1983|accessdate= October 15, 2007|archivedate=October 24, 2019|archiveurl= https://web.archive.org/web/20191024011633/https://www.rogerebert.com/reviews/spring-break-1983|url-status=live}}</ref> In 1984 she starred with a then unknown Willem Dafoe in the erotic vignette film, New York Nights. She also appeared in the 1987 comedy Amazon Women on the Moon as an interactive video girl, and also in 1987 she starred in the post-apocalyptic film Equalizer 2000. Corinne played a dominatrix in the 1988 comedy Screwball Hotel.  In 1991, Alphen made an appearance on the TV sitcom Night Court.'' She also appeared in an episode of the detective series, Mike Hammer.

She studied at The Tarot School of New York, receiving two certifications in advanced tarot card reading.

Personal life
She was married to actor Ken Wahl from 1983 or 1984 (sources differ) until their 1991 divorce, and was occasionally credited as Corinne Wahl during their marriage. Alphen and Wahl have one child together, a son named Raymond Wahl.

See also 
 List of Penthouse Pets of the Year

References

External links
 Official website
 
 

Penthouse Pets of the Year
American female adult models
American film actresses
American television actresses
Tarot readers
Actresses from Massachusetts
Actors from Lynn, Massachusetts
1954 births
Living people
21st-century American women